This is a list of the Sweden national football team results from 1908 to 1919. Between their first match in 1908 and 1919, Sweden played in 55 matches, resulting in 21 victories, 9 draws, 25 defeats. Throughout this period they played in the Olympic Football Tournament twice, with Sweden finishing fourth in 1908 and being eliminated in the first round in 1912 by the Netherlands.

Results

1908

1909

1910

1911

1912

1913

1914

1915

1916

1917

1918

1919

See also
 Sweden national football team results (1920–1939)
 Sweden national football team results (1940–1959)
 Sweden national football team results (1960–1979)
 Sweden national football team results (1980–1989)
 Sweden national football team results (1990–1999)
 Sweden national football team results (2000–2009)
 Sweden national football team results (2010–2019)
 Sweden national football team results (2020–present)

References

External links
Results at RSSSF 

1900s in Sweden
1910s in Sweden
1900